Chelsea Martin (born 1986 in California) is an American author and illustrator.

Early life 
She received a BFA from California College of the Arts in 2008.

Career 
She is the author of Everything Was Fine Until Whatever (Future Tense Books, 2009), The Really Funny Thing About Apathy (Sunnyoutside, 2010), Kramer Sutra (Universal Error, 2012), and Even Though I Don't Miss You (Short Flight/Long Drive Books, 2013), which was named one of the Best Indie Books of 2013 by Dazed Magazine and was a small press bestseller. Her work has also appeared in numerous journals including Poetry Foundation, Hobart (magazine), Lena Dunham's newsletter Lenny Letter Vice' and the Alt lit Anthology '’40 Likely To Die Before 40.'’

Her work has been described as "emotionally honest", "provocative and disturbing", and, "less disaffected than the Alt lit peers she's associated with." Her work has often been compared to that of Harmony Korine.

Nylon Magazine said her work "feels like a meditation on consciousness, feeling, and of course, the absence of both," and Publishers Weekly called The Really Funny Thing About Apathy "a fixation on fleeting incidents in the life of the young and fearful."

Works and publications 
Everything Was Fine Until Whatever (Future Tense Books, 2009) 
The Really Funny Thing About Apathy (Sunnyoutside Press, 2010) 
Even Though I Don't Miss You (Short Flight/Long Drive Books, 2013) 
Mickey (Curbside Splendor, 2016) 
Caca Dolce (Soft Skull Press, 2017) 
Tell Me I’m an Artist (Soft Skull Press, 2022)

Other work
Martin is a comic artist. Her comic Heavy-Handed was published bi-weekly on The Rumpus in 2012 and 2013. She is also the illustrator of the book of poetry Four-Letter Poems by Joshua Brandon (Universal Error, 2011).

In 2010, Martin founded the art collective Universal Error, where she is currently Creative Director.

Martin has self-published several chapbooks and comic books, and is a proponent of self-publishing.

References

External links
Official website
Universal Error
McDonald's is Impossible at The Poetry Foundation
Heavy-Handed
Interview on The Rumpus
Interview at Word Riot
Dream Date on Pequin

21st-century American poets
American female comics artists
Alternative literature
American women short story writers
1986 births
Living people
21st-century American women writers
American women poets
California College of the Arts alumni
21st-century American short story writers